Jack Dawson may refer to:

Jack Dawson (Australian rules footballer) (1885–1964), Australian rules footballer
Jack Dawson (rugby league), Australian rugby league player
Jack Dawson (character), a fictional character in the 1997 film Titanic, played by Leonardo DiCaprio

See also
John Dawson (disambiguation)